The 43rd Directors Guild of America Awards, honoring the outstanding directorial achievements in film and television in 1990, were presented on March 16, 1991 at the Beverly Hilton and the Crowne Plaza New York. The ceremony in Beverly Hills was hosted by Alan Alda and the ceremony in New York was hosted by Paul Sorvino. The feature film nominees were announced on January 30, 1991 and nominees in eight television categories were announced on February 4, 1991.

Winners and nominees

Film

Television

Commercials

Frank Capra Achievement Award
 Howard W. Koch

Preston Sturgess Award 
 Billy Wilder

Robert B. Aldrich Service Award
 Larry Auerbach
 Milt Felsen

Franklin J. Schaffner Achievement Award
 Chester O'Brien
 Mortimer O'Brien

Honorary Life Member
 Gilbert Cates

References

External links
 

Directors Guild of America Awards
1990 film awards
1990 television awards
Direct
Direct
Directors
1991 in Los Angeles
1991 in New York City
March 1991 events in the United States